State Road 272 (NM 272) is a  state highway in the US state of New Mexico. NM 272's southern terminus is at the end of state route south of Fort Sumner State Monument, and the northern terminus is at U.S. Route 60 (US 60) and US 84 east of Fort Sumner.

Major intersections

See also

References

272
Transportation in De Baca County, New Mexico